Calvin Henry Howard (March 24, 1911 – September 10, 1993) was an American cartoon story artist, animator and director mostly remembered for his work at Walter Lantz Productions and Warner Bros. Cartoons. He was also the voice actor of Gabby Goat in Get Rich Quick Porky and Meathead Dog in Screwball Squirrel.

Career
In the late 1920s, Howard became a story man and animator for Walter Lantz Productions, then Walt Disney Animation in 1929. During his career, he worked for several pioneer animators besides Lantz and Disney, including Max Fleischer and Ub Iwerks. From 1930 to 1933, Howard serves as a story man for Iwerks and then Lantz. 

In 1938, Howard left Warner Bros. Cartoons with his friend Tedd Pierce to work for Fleischer Studios in Miami, and served as the live-action model for Prince David in Fleischer's Gulliver's Travels. In the 1940s, Howard moved to a different studio. He left Fleischer for the Metro-Goldwyn-Mayer cartoon studio in 1942, where he served as an uncredited writer for Tom and Jerry. He was fired by Fred Quimby, after discovering that he brought alcohol to the ink and paint department during the Christmas holiday. Howard would move to Screen Gems, and later returned to Warner Bros 1949. 

At 1974, Howard returned to Disney as a story artist. In 1949 Cal Howard moved from California to New York City, to work on NBC's Broadway Open House and Your Show of Shows. When Broadway Open House ended he was hired by Pat Weaver to be an associate producer and writer for the development of NBC's Today Show. He left NBC early in 1952 to return to California and work with Ralph Edwards. In the 1960s he returned to cartoon work, until his retirement. Cal Howard worked over seven animation studios in his lifetime and finally received the Annie Award in 1980 for lifetime achievement. He also served on the advisory board of the National Student Film Institute.

References

External links

1911 births
1993 deaths
American animators
American animated film directors
Warner Bros. Cartoons people
Fleischer Studios people
Walter Lantz Productions people
Walt Disney Animation Studios people